Ilku of Kish was the twentieth Sumerian king in the First Dynasty of Kish, according to the Sumerian King List. His name does not appear in Early Dynastic inscriptions, meaning that he is unlikely to have been a real historical person.

References 

|-

29th-century BC Sumerian kings
Kings of Kish
Year of birth unknown
Year of death unknown
Sumerian kings